The Flame is the debut studio album by Australian country singer Gina Jeffreys. It was released in 1994 and it was the first album by an Australian female country singer to be certified gold. It was later certified platinum in 1997.

The album was nominated for Best Country Album at the ARIA Music Awards of 1995.

Jeffreys dedicated the album to her parents.

Background
After releasing her first single "Slipping Away" through BMG Music, Jeffreys signed a record deal with ABC Music, and released her first single for the label "Two Stars Fell" in 1993. The song went straight to No.1 on the country charts. The song won the 'Female Vocalist of the Year' award at the 1994 Tamworth Country Music Awards of Australia. 
Jeffrey recorded a full album and it was released in 1994 and won the 'Female Vocalist of the Year' again in 1995 with the song "Girls’ Night Out".

Track listing
 Standard Edition (PLU: 991264) 
 "Girls’ Night Out" (Gina Jeffreys, Garth Porter, Rod McCormack) (3:12) 
 "My Shoes Keep Walking Back To You"  (featuring Lee Kernaghan) (Bob Wills) (2:59) 
 "Standing Too Close To The Flame" (Jim Stewart, Gloria Sklerov) (3:48) 
 "Last Night I Dreamed Of Loving You" (Hugh Moffatt) (3:19) 
 "Rocking Chair" (Gina Jeffreys, Garth Porter, David Bates, Rod McCormack) (4:03) 
 "I Don’t Want To Be Alone Tonight"  (Gina Jeffreys, Garth Porter, David Bates, Rod McCormack) (4:03) 
 "Getting Used To Getting Over You" (Gina Jeffreys, Garth Porter, Rod McCormack) (3:10) 
 "I Do My Crying At Night" (Lefty Frizzell, Sanger D. Shafer, A.L. Owens) (2:21) 
 "Affairs Of The Heart" (Kirk Lorange) (3:33) 
 "She Knows" (Gina Jeffreys, Garth Porter, David Bates) (3:54) 
 "Men"  (feat. Tania Kernaghan)(Robert Byrne, Alan Schulman) (3:36) 
 "Wildflower" (Gina Jeffreys, David Bates) (2:52) 
 "I Don’t Want Tonight To Be Over" Gina Jeffreys, Garth Porter, Rod McCormack) (3:39) 
 "Distant Star" (Gina Jeffreys, David Bates) (2:58) 
 "Two Stars Fell" (Jim Robertson) (3:33)  Bonus Track 

 1995 Re-release 2CD Bonus Tracks
 "Didn’t We Shine" (J. Winchester, D. Schlitz) (3:52)
 "Nothing But a Child" (Steve Earle) (3:51)
 "Mercedez Benz" (Michael McClure) (3:27)
 "You're No Good" (Clint Ballard, Jr. ) (2:26)
 "If This is Love" (Steele, Farren) (3:27)
 "The One I Love" (M. McClellan) (1:07)
 "I’m Getting Over You" (B. Cadd) (3:17)

Charts

Certifications

Awards
The album was nominated for Best Country Album at the ARIA Music Awards of 1995 but lost to ‘’Beyond the Dancing’’ by Troy Cassar-Daley.

Personnel
Adapted from album liner.

 Produced by Garth Porter
 Recorded and Mixed by Ted Howard
 Bandtracks recorded at Paradise Studio, Sydney
 Overdubbing at Glebe Studios, Sydney
 Mixed at Studios 301, Sydney
 Assisted by Lachlan Mitchell
 Mastered at Studio 301 by Steve Smart
 Photography by Jon Waddy
 Mark Myers – Drums
 James Gillard - Bass
 Ian Lees – Bass
 Victor Rounds – Bass
 Rod McCormack – Electric, Nylon String & Acoustic Guitar, 
 Mandolin, Dobro & Percussion
 Colin Watson – Acoustic Guitar, Acoustic Rhythm
 Tom Ferris – Acoustic & Electric Guitar
 David Bates – Acoustic Guitar
 Mark Punch – Electric Guitar
 Kirk Lorange – Electric Guitar
 Mick Albeck – Fiddle
 Larry Muhoberac – Piano
 Michel Rose – Pedal Steel
 Garth Porter – Tambourine, B3 Hammond Organ
 Dave Fennell – Keyboards
 Tony Ansell - Keyboards
 TC Cassidy, Carol Young, Mark Punch, James Gillard, Gina Jeffreys – Harmony

References

1994 debut albums
Gina Jeffreys albums